The 2020–21 season was the 128th season in the existence of VfB Stuttgart and the club's first season back in the top flight of German football. In addition to the domestic league, VfB Stuttgart participated in this season's edition of the DFB-Pokal. The season covered the period from 1 July 2020 to 30 June 2021.

Players

First-team squad

Out on loan

Transfers

In

Out

Pre-season and friendlies

Competitions

Overview

Bundesliga

League table

Results summary

Results by round

Matches
The league fixtures were announced on 7 August 2020.

DFB-Pokal

Statistics

Appearances and goals

|-
! colspan=14 style=background:#dcdcdc; text-align:center| Goalkeepers

|-
! colspan=14 style=background:#dcdcdc; text-align:center| Defenders

|-
! colspan=14 style=background:#dcdcdc; text-align:center| Midfielders

 

|-
! colspan=14 style=background:#dcdcdc; text-align:center| Forwards

 

|-
! colspan=14 style=background:#dcdcdc; text-align:center| Players transferred out during the season

Goalscorers

Last updated: 22 May 2021

References

External links

VfB Stuttgart seasons
VfB Stuttgart